Georges Ahnne (21 March 1903 – 3 August 1949) was a French Polynesian politician who represented French Polynesia in the French National Assembly from 1946 until his death in 1949.

Ahnne was a descendant of Protestant missionaries. He studied law in Bordeaux and worked as a lawyer in Papeete. He was elected to the Constituent Assembly in the June 1946 French legislative election. He was re-elected in the November 1946 French legislative election. He was succeeded as MP by Pouvanaa a Oopa.

References

1903 births
1949 deaths
People from Papeete
20th-century French politicians
Deputies of the 1st National Assembly of the French Fourth Republic